Khovd (in older sources also Kobdo) can refer to:

 Khovd River, a river in the west of Mongolia
 Khovd (city), the capital of Khovd aimag
 Khovd Province, an aimag (province) in Mongolia
 Khovd Airport, the airport of Khovd city
 Heise peak, on Bayankharikhan mountain south of Khovd River
 several sums (districts) in different aimags of Mongolia:
 Khovd, Khovd
 Khovd, Uvs